Glendale Community College (GCC) is a public community college in Glendale, California.

History 
The college was founded as Glendale Junior College in 1927, to serve the Glendale Union High School District which at the time included La Crescenta, Glendale, and Tujunga. From 1927 to 1929 classes were held in the buildings of Glendale Union High School at Broadway and Verdugo in the City of Glendale. In 1929 the junior college moved to the Harvard School plant of the Glendale Union High School District where it remained until 1937. In this year a new plant, part of the present one, was completed and occupied. The year before, in 1936, the Glendale Junior College District was dissolved as such and became a part of the new Glendale Unified School District. The name of the school was changed to Glendale College in 1944. On July 1, 1970, Glendale College became a part of the Glendale Junior College District. On April 20, 1971, the Board of Education adopted a resolution changing the District name to Glendale Community College District.

On November 3, 1980, Glendale voters approved a measure to establish separate Boards, with the new board taking office in April 1981. The separation resulted in the creation of a Board of Trustees solely responsible for the governance of the Glendale Community College District. In 1936,  were acquired for the present site of the college.

Campus 

It is located on the slopes of the San Rafael Hills overlooking the valleys in the Glendale area.

Organization and administration 
The college president is Dr. Ryan Cornner.

Glendale Community College District
The Glendale Community College District is a constituent community college district of the California Community College System (CCCS), whose only college is GCC.

It is governed by a 5-member elected Board of Trustees, elected by geographical district effective in 2017. Pursuant to their authority, they have promulgated policies and administrative regulations for the administration of the district and GCC and serves Glendale and La Crescenta-Montrose.

The elections for the Glendale Community College Board of Trustees is held at the same day the Glendale City Council and Glendale Unified School District Board of Education, which takes place on a first Tuesday after the first Monday in April of odd-numbered years. Effective with the March 2020 election, the elections are held on a first Tuesday after the first Monday.

Academics 
The college has an open admissions policy and offers credit for life experiences. It is accredited by the Accrediting Commission for Community and Junior Colleges (ACCJC).

Athletics 
The college athletic teams are nicknamed the Vaqueros (men) or Lady Vaqueros (women). Glendale currently fields eight men's and eight women's varsity teams. It competes as a member of the California Community College Athletic Association (CCCAA) in the Western State Conference (WSC) for all sports except football, which competes in Southern California Football Association (SCFA).

Notable people

Alumni 

Gustav “Lil Peep” Åhr, rapper (attended 2014–2015)
Mark Caguioa, professional basketball player 
Glenn Corbett, actor
Marian Cleeves Diamond, Professor Emeritus of Anatomy & Neuroanatomy at University of California, Berkeley, taught at UCB for over 50 years; one of the founders of modern neuroscience
Angie Dickinson, actress, award winner, philanthropist, Police Woman (TV), Over 50 movies, author and fitness & health expert.
Marco Estrada, pitcher Toronto Blue Jays
Cathy Ferguson, two-time Olympic gold medalist swimmer
Bob Gagliano, American football player
Blake Gailen (born 1985), American-Israeli baseball player
Beverly Garland, actress
Dan Harmon, television writer/producer; creator of Community and Rick and Morty.
Ron Lopez, football player
Hue Jackson, NFL coach
Donald D. Lorenzen (1920–80), LA City Council member, 1969–77
Masiela Lusha, actress
Eva Mendes, actress
Dick Moje, National Football League player
Ricky Ortiz, professional wrestler
Danielle Panabaker, actress
Kay Panabaker, actress, zoologist 
Andy Reid, two-time Super Bowl-winning NFL coach
Freddy Sanchez, baseball player
Seann William Scott, actor
Ryan Seacrest, broadcaster, producer
Quincy “Schoolboy Q” Hanley, rapper
Ryan Sherriff (born 1990), Major League baseball player for the St. Louis Cardinals
Lon Simmons, broadcaster
Juno Stover, two-time Olympic diving medalist; two-time USA-AAU champion; two-time Pan-American Games medalist
Vic Tayback, actor
Erick Thohir, Indonesian businessman
Jordi Vilasuso, actor
Kyle Vincent, musician
Matt Whisenant, MLB baseball player
Frank Wykoff, three-time Olympic gold medalist runner.

In popular culture

Glendale Community College inspired the NBC show Community which premiered in the fall season of 2009. The show uses the fictional setting of Greendale Community College; the show's creator, Dan Harmon, has stated that the show was actually based on his experience attending Glendale Community College. Harmon describes the series as "flawed characters [coming into Greendale] and becoming unflawed by being in this place because it's been underestimated by the system around it."

Notes

References

External links
 Official website

 
Buildings and structures in Glendale, California
California Community Colleges
Education in Glendale, California
Educational institutions established in 1927
Schools accredited by the Western Association of Schools and Colleges
Universities and colleges in Los Angeles County, California
1927 establishments in California